Tubini Mansion is an Ottoman era mansion in Istanbul, Turkey.

Background
Bernnard Tubini and his wealthy family immigrated from the Greek island Syros to Constantinople, today Istanbul. The family lived in the beginning in Pera, and then moved to around Rumelihisarı, both on the European side of the Ottoman Empire's capital. Finally, they settled in Moda, Kadıköy on the Asian part of the city by building a mansion as a pioneer in a then rural area . Father Tubiniwas a banker in Galata, who was also involved in financial business with the sultan. The son Tubini managed a furniture business in Beşiktaş, where 400 people worked.

Mansion
Tubini Mansion is located at Mühürdar St. in Moda quarter of Kadıköy district in Istanbul, Turkey. It was built on a  ground in the 1850s. There are two halls, 14 rooms, five bathrooms and six restrooms. The mansion underwent arenovated in 1977.

After the death of Bernard Tubini, the groom Nomiko built seven identical houses for his seven sons around the mansion. Thus, the vineyards and orchards developed to a residential area, and was called "Tubini neighborhood".

Late September 2020, the mansion was put on sale for a price 16.5 million (approx. US$2.156 million).

References

Ottoman architecture in Istanbul
Buildings and structures of the Ottoman Empire
Mansions in Turkey
Buildings and structures in Istanbul
Houses completed in the 19th century
Houses completed in 1903
Kadıköy
19th-century architecture in Turkey